Bliss Descending is the first released extended play by Jason Falkner, released on October 19, 2004 by Wreckhords Records.

Critical reception

The EP received highly positive reviews from music critics. Tim Sendra of AllMusic wrote that each song “...would have sounded great on an album, no filler to be found”. He praised the EP’s production and songcraft as well as Falkner’s vocals, calling the songs “Moving Up” and “The Neighbor” the best songs from the release. In a track-by-track review for PopMatters, Gary Glauber criticized the “weak rhyming” of “The Neighbor”, but praised tracks such as “Moving Up” and “Lost Myself”. In summation, Glauber writes, “Listening to Falkner's music is a joyous event -- his ebullience inspires smiles all around. There's a simple innocence and charm to the songs; he sings as though you're a confidante, and you get sucked into the whorl of pretty layered sounds and perfect fills. If these songs are a preview of the longer work upcoming, put me down for one now.”

Track listing

All songs written and composed by Jason Falkner.

Personnel

Jason Falkner — vocals, instrumentation, production, mixing
Justin Stacey — drums on “The Neighbor” and “Moving Up”
Justin Stanley — mixing on “The Neighbor” and “Moving Up”

References

External links
Bliss Descending (EP) at Discogs (list of releases)

2004 debut EPs
Power pop EPs
Alternative rock EPs
Jason Falkner albums